Mercy is the seventeenth studio album by Welsh musician and composer John Cale. It was released on 20 January 2023 by Double Six Records, making it Cale's first album of new songs in over a decade. It features collaborations with Tony Allen, Laurel Halo, Weyes Blood, Tei Shi, Animal Collective's Avey Tare and Panda Bear, Dev Hynes, Sylvan Esso, Actress, and Fat White Family. It was inspired by current events such as Donald Trump's presidency, Brexit, COVID-19, climate change, civil rights, and right-wing extremism.

Background 
Cale has hinted at a new album numerous times over the years following the release of M:FANS (2016), his previous studio album featuring reworkings of old songs, and Shifty Adventures in Nookie Wood (2012), his last album with all new songs. When M:FANS was released in January 2016 Cale said that another new album with new songs would be released by the end of the year. According to a November 2017 interview, the album was set for a 2018 release. In September 2018, Cale said it will be released the following year. The album was subsequently completed before the COVID-19 pandemic, but its release was delayed.

On 1 August 2022 the first single from the yet-unnamed album, "Night Crawling", was released along with an animated video by Mickey Miles. The second single, "Story of Blood" featuring Weyes Blood, was released on 19 October 2022. The music video, directed by Jethro Waters, was released on the same day along with announcing the album title and track listing.

The standard edition of Mercy contains twelve songs, while the special edition includes a bonus 7" single with two more songs.

Critical reception

Mercy was named the album of the month by Uncut with Tom Pinnock calling it "the most out-there work Cale has made in some time, a hermetically sealed, hallucinogenic journey that's as neon-lit and gothic as its cover art."

Track listing

Personnel
Musicians

 John Cale – vocals, string arrangements (all tracks), bass guitar (1, 4–11, 13, 14), drums (1–5, 7–11), piano (1, 2, 4, 7–9, 12, 14), synthesizers (1–3, 8–10), noises (2), vintage keyboards (3, 5, 13, 14), Swarmatron (5), keyboards (6, 8, 11), acoustic guitar (10), guitar (11), additional strings (12); drone, percussion (13)
 Laurel Halo – additional vocals, effects, synthesizers (1)
 Matt Fish – cello (2–4, 6, 7, 12)
 Ian Walker – double bass (2–4, 6, 7, 12)
 Actress – synthesizers, effects (2)
 Joey Maramba – bass guitar (3, 5), bowed bass (4)
 Deantoni Parks – acoustic drums (3, 7), timpani (3), additional synthesizers (5), electronic drums (7), additional drums (8)
 Dustin Boyer – guitar (3), bass guitar (4), noises (7), backing vocals (8, 11); rhythm guitar, guitar solo (10); guitar (11)
 Caroline Buckman – viola (3, 4, 7)
 Leah Katz – viola (3, 4, 7)
 Rodney Wirtz – viola (3, 4, 7)
 Eric Gorfain – violin (3, 4, 7)
 Marissa Kuney – violin (3, 4, 7)
 Jenny Takamatsu – violin (3, 4, 7)
 Nita Scott – additional drums (4), additional percussion (9); additional drum programming, backing vocals (11)
 Weyes Blood – vocals (4)
 Nick Sanborn – acoustic guitar (5)
 Amelia Meath – vocals (5)
 Destani Wolf – backing vocals (6)
 Brian Weitz – synthesizers (7)
 Dave Portner – vocals (7)
 Noah Lennox – vocals (7)
 Tokimonsta – effects (9)
 Dev Hynes – acoustic guitar (10)
 Tei Shi – vocals (10)
 Jack Everett – acoustic drums, backing vocals (11)
 Adam J. Harmer – guitar, backing vocals (11)
 Nathan Saoudi – Juno, backing vocals (11)
 Lias Saoudi – vocals (11)
 Tony Allen – acoustic drums (14)

Technical
 John Cale – production
 Nita Scott – production (all tracks), mixing (14)
 Mike Bozzi – mastering
 Mikaelin Bluespruce – mixing (1, 3, 4, 11)
 Seven Davis Jr – mixing (2, 6, 8, 9, 13)
 Tokimonsta – mixing (5)
 Justin Raisen – mixing (7, 10, 12)
 Dustin Boyer – mixing (14), engineering (all tracks), additional production (8)
 Actress – additional production (2)

Visuals
 Abby Portner – artwork
 Rob Carmichael – graphic design

Charts

References

2023 albums
John Cale albums
Albums produced by John Cale
Double Six Records albums